Gorgostane is a triterpene, its derivative distributed in corals, hence the name. Compared with other steroids, there is a cyclopropane ring in the 17C side-chain.

References

Triterpenes